Pegasus was a winged horse sired by Poseidon in Greek mythology.

Pegasus may also refer to:

Arts and entertainment

Fictional entities
 Pegasus (Disney), characters in Disney's 1997 film Hercules
 Pegasus, a spacecraft in the movie The Mystery of the Third Planet
 Pegasus, a spacecraft in the TV series Space Odyssey
 Pegasus, an auto garage in the TV series Gekisou Sentai Carranger
 Pegasus Galaxy (Stargate), a location in the TV series Stargate Atlantis
 Pegasus Seiya, a Saint Seiya character
Pegasus ponies, a subspecies of ponies in the My Little Pony franchise
 Maximillion Pegasus or Pegasus J. Crawford, a Yu-Gi-Oh! character

Film and television
 Pegasus (film), a 2019 Chinese comedy film
 "Pegasus" (Battlestar Galactica)
 "The Pegasus" (Star Trek: The Next Generation)
 Pegasus (TV series), a BBC serial about Robert Fulton
 PEGASYS-TV, a television station

Music
 "Pegasus" (instrumental), by The Allman Brothers Band
 Pegasus (Trippie Redd album), 2020
 Pegasus, a 2005 album by The Phoenix Foundation
 Pegasus Records, an offshoot of the UK 1970s B&C Records label
 Pegasus Award, an award in filk music

Publications
 Pegasus (game magazine), published in 1981 by Judges Guild
 Pegasus (novel), 2010 novel by Robin McKinley
 Pegasus Publications, a Canadian magazine publisher
 Pegasus (series), 2011 novel series by Kate O'Hearn
 Pegasus (University of Central Florida magazine)

Other uses in arts and entertainment
 Pegasus (Efteling), a roller coaster in the Netherlands
 Pegasus (Mt. Olympus Water and Theme Park), a roller coaster in Wisconsin Dells, Wisconsin
 Pegasus (Pilz), a 1863 pair of bronze sculptures by Vincent Pilz
 PHM Pegasus, a 1986 ship simulation game

Astronomy
 Pegasus (constellation), a constellation in the northern sky
 Pegasus (Chinese astronomy), symbolized as the Black Tortoise of the North
 Pegasus Dwarf Irregular Galaxy or Peg DIG, a member of the Local Group of galaxies
 Pegasus Dwarf Spheroidal Galaxy or Pegasus II, a satellite of the Andromeda Galaxy

Military operations
 Operation Pegasus, a World War II operation
 Capture of the Caen canal and Orne river bridges, a World War II operation involving the Pegasus Bridge in Normandy
 Pegasus Bridge, in Normandy, France, site of the 1944 operation
 Operation Pegasus (1968), a Vietnam War operation

Organizations

Businesses
 Pegasus Airlines, a Turkish airline
 Pegasus Networks, a former Australian Internet service provider, founded in 1989
 Pegasus Publications, a Canadian magazine publisher
 Pegasus Records, an offshoot of the UK 1970s B&C Records label
 Pegasus Software, a British manufacturer of accounting software
 Air Pegasus, an Indian regional airline, 2015–2016
 Pegasus Universal Aerospace, a South African aerospace startup

Other organizations
 Partnership of a European Group of Aeronautics and Space Universities, a network of aeronautical universities in Europe
 PEGASYS-TV, a public-access television station
 HMH-463 or Pegasus, a U.S. Marine helicopter squadron

People
 Pegasus (artist) (Chris Turner, born 1988)
 Plotius Pegasus, ancient Roman jurist of the Proculeian school who practiced law in the 1st century CE
 Chris Benoit (1967–2007), Canadian professional wrestler known as the Wild Pegasus

Sports
 Pegasus Athletic F.C., a 1971–1972 English football club
 Pegasus A.F.C., a 1948–1963 English amateur football club, based in Oxford
 Hereford Pegasus F.C., a football club based in Hereford, England
 Pegasus Cup, a rowing prize in the May Bumps, England
 Pegasus Stakes, an American horse race
 Hong Kong Pegasus FC, a Hong Kong football club

Technology

Computing

 Pegasus (console), a video game system
 Pegasus (spyware), multi-platform spyware created by the NSO Group based in Israel
 Pegasus (workflow management), an open-source workflow management system
 PEGASUS, an encryption algorithm
 Ferranti Pegasus, a British computer developed in the 1950s
 Pegasus Mail, an email client
 Windows CE, an operating-system developed under the code name "Pegasus"
 Open Pegasus, a Web-Based Enterprise Management (WBEM) implementation

Vehicles and engines

Aircraft
 Aero Adventure Pegasus, a civil utility aircraft
 Boeing KC-46 Pegasus, U.S. Air Force refueling tanker
 HAI Pegasus, an unmanned aerial vehicle
 Howland H-3 Pegasus, ultralight aircraft
 Northrop Grumman X-47A Pegasus, a demonstration Unmanned Combat Aerial Vehicle
 Powrachute Pegasus, an American powered parachute design
 Pegasus VBJ, a VTOL business jet concept

Engines
 Bristol Pegasus, a radial aircraft engine
 Rolls-Royce Pegasus, a turbofan aircraft engine, originally manufactured by Bristol

Rockets and spacecraft
 Northrop Grumman Pegasus (Pegasus I), an air-launched rocket developed by Orbital Sciences Corporation
 Pegasus (satellite), three American satellites launched in 1965

Watercraft
 HMS Pegasus, the name of several British Royal Navy ships
 USS Pegasus, the name of two ships of the United States Navy
 Pegasus-class hydrofoil, a series of U.S. Navy patrol boats
 , the name of a paddle steamer which sank in 1843

Other vehicles
 Pegasus (hovercraft), a hovercraft vehicle made for educational purposes
 Pegasus Automobile, a Lotus Seven replica
 Great Wall Pegasus, a full-size SUV

Other technology
 SLWH Pegasus, a piece of artillery

Other uses
 Pegasus (fish), a genus of fish known as seamoths
 Pegasus (mascot), of the University of Central Florida
 Pegasus (train), an international overnight express train service between Switzerland and the Netherlands
 Pegasus (typeface), a typeface released in 1937 by Berthold Wolpe
 Pegasus Bridge, in Normandy, France
 Pegasus crossing, a type of street crossing
 Pegasus Field, an airstrip in Antarctica

See also
 Flying horses (disambiguation)
 Pegasus II (disambiguation)
 Pegasus Bay, New Zealand
 Pegasus Toroidal Experiment, a plasma physics experiment
 Peginterferon alfa-2a, an antiviral drug, sold under the name Pegasys
 Pegasus, New Zealand, a town
 Winged horse (disambiguation)